Araeococcus micranthus is a plant species in the genus Araeococcus. This species is native to Trinidad and Tobago, Venezuela, the Guianas, and northern Brazil.

References

micranthus
Flora of Trinidad and Tobago
Flora of South America
Plants described in 1841
Taxa named by Adolphe-Théodore Brongniart
Flora without expected TNC conservation status